The Lapstone Zig Zag was a zig zag railway built between  and  stations on the Main Western line of New South Wales in Australia. Constructed between 1863 and 1865 to overcome an otherwise insurmountable climb up the eastern side of the Blue Mountains, the zig zag and associated Knapsack Viaduct, a sandstone arch viaduct, were designed by John Whitton, Engineer-in-Charge of New South Wales Government Railways, and were built by William Watkins. The zig zag was listed on the Blue Mountains local government heritage register on 27 December 1991; while the adjacent Knapsack Viaduct was listed on the New South Wales Heritage Database on 2 April 1999. The Lapstone ZigZag was the world-first ZigZag constructed on any main-line railway.

The ruling grade was already very steep at 1 in 33 (3%). Another of the early plans had been to build the whole line across the Blue Mountains on a completely different route through the Grose Valley with a  tunnel, but this was beyond the resources of the colony of New South Wales at the time. The track included the Knapsack Viaduct and the subsequently abandoned Lucasville station, opened in 1877.

The zig zag closed in 1892 when the Main Western line was diverted via the Glenbrook Deviation and subsequently sections of the line were repurposed as the Great Western Highway, and later use as a walking track.

History

Nineteenth century 
The contract to build this railway from Penrith as far as Valley Heights, which included building the Knapsack Viaduct and the Lapstone ZigZag, was awarded to William Watkins in March 1863 but was completed eighteen months behind schedule in December 1865. It opened for traffic in 1867.

Once the westbound train had crossed Knapsack Viaduct, it entered the Bottom Road of the ZigZag. There were points where the Middle Road cut backwards and sharply upwards to form the middle stroke of the Z. Beyond the points, Bottom Road extended an additional  to a dead-end. It was in this area that the train stopped before it reversed direction to climb Middle Road. Similarly at the junction of Middle and Top Roads, Top Road continued some distance to buffers on the edge of Knapsack Gorge. Here the train again reversed its direction to resume the journey over the Blue Mountains. Lucasville Station was completed in 1877 on the extension section of Top Road. In 1886 the line of the Top Road extension was remodelled with a new parallel, more steeply sloped line to the west. Both of the lines of the Top Road extension are clearly legible.

The line of track (now without rails) goes through well executed rock cuttings on the standard walk along Top Road from Knapsack Street and Skarratt Park. There is a pleasing stone culvert to the south of Lucasville platform. Lucasville station was built in 1877 for the Minister for Mines, John Lucas who had a holiday home nearby. The culvert, which is still in operation, utilises a rock-cutting on the west side to divert run-off water deep under the track in a square channel constructed of stone blocks. The water then runs down a steep gully to the east. To the west of the Upper Road there is a series of low sandstone terrace walls which probably marked the boundary between Lucasville estate and the railway. The ZigZag is largely surrounded by bushland, interspersed with impressive views east to Sydney. The setting provides a striking sense of the nineteenth-century journey over the mountains as the traveller was entering into a wilderness. At the southern entry to the Top Road of the ZigZag, at the end of Knapsack Street, there is a gate to inhibit vehicle access. Just beside this gate, on the northern side, there are four surviving sleepers and metal spikes, all that survives from the original railway track.

The rail route across the mountains extended as far as Wentworth Falls (then called "Weatherboard") by 1867 but the Lapstone Zig Zag, which included Lucasville station, soon ran into problems: the length of the top points and bottom points limited the length of trains and the single track meant that trains travelling in opposite directions had to stop at crossing points. The first crossing point after Lapstone Zig Zag was at Wascoe's Siding at what is now Glenbrook station.

The Lapstone ZigZag was the first ZigZag constructed on any main-line railway anywhere in the world. The idea on which Whitton built came from the Indian railways. A friend of his, Solomon Tredwell, had in 1859 started the construction of half a ZigZag (with a reversing line and stone viaducts) at Bhore Ghat on the Bombay to Poona line. Although Tredwell died in 1859, his widow saw the half ZigZag to completion in 1863, employing 42,000 men, and this feat was reported at some length in The Sydney Morning Herald on 3 July 1863. Whitton knew of the conquering of the Bhore Ghat, which posed problems very comparable to the Lapstone Monocline, both from personal and public communications. The way in which he adapted the Indian experience into a full ZigZag, approached over an exquisite, and very cheap, sandstone viaduct, was a substantial feat in world terms of railway engineering.

The single track contributed to a fatal accident at Emu Plains in 1878 where eastbound and westbound goods trains collided.

In 1890 signal boxes were built at both Lower and Upper Points of the Zig Zag, this was to replace the operation of pointsmen using hand levers.

The Glenbrook tunnel deviation

Commissioner of Railways, E. M. Eddy, decided that the ZigZag should be replaced by the deviation including a tunnel, both built around 1890. The Lapstone ZigZag and Lucasville station were officially closed on 18 December 1892 and the rails were raised, after the completion of the Glenbrook Tunnel Deviation. The Deviation soon experienced problems as it was built at the same too steep grade as the Zig Zag which caused the locomotives to slip in the tunnel, mostly due to water leaking onto the tunnel floor from nearby creek, and smoke also became a problem for uphill trains, as the tunnel was not designed to vent the smoke.

The building of the tunnel is the subject of Arthur Streeton's famous painting Fire's On.

Twentieth century 
By 1910, the line as a whole was being duplicated (made into double track) and the "rathole" tunnel was replaced on a different deviation with a gentler alignment with 1 in 60 (1.67%) grades and the new Glenbrook Tunnel at Bluffs point on the Glenbrook Creek escarpment. From then on the lower section of the track, including the historic Knapsack Gully Viaduct, was converted into a road, the Great Western Highway, the main road up the Lapstone hill until the M4 motorway replaced it in 1993. The older tunnel was converted for mushroom growing but was also used by the RAAF for storage during World War II. During 1943 to 1946 the  Glenbrook tunnel stored chemical weapons, mainly of bulk drums of mustard. Today the Zig Zag, Knapsack Viaduct, The Old Glenbook Tunnel, and Lucasville station can all be accessed by walking tracks.

Knapsack Viaduct, 1863-65 

The Knapsack Viaduct is a sandstone arch viaduct, designed by John Whitton and built by William Watkins. Its purpose was to carry the Main Western railway line across Knapsack Gully. It formed part of the Zig Zag, which climbed the eastern escarpment from Emu Plains to today's Glenbrook. Whitton also designed and built the Victoria Bridge across the Nepean River at Penrith.

Construction of the Knapsack Gully Viaduct started in March 1863 by contractor W. Watkins, who also completed the stone piers of the Victoria Bridge at Penrith. Work was completed in 1865, with the bridge being constructed from local sandstone quarried in the neighbourhood around Lapstone, and carried a single rail line.

The viaduct fell into disuse in 1913 after the completion of the Glenbrook Gorge Deviation. In 1926, after over a decade of disuse, the Knapsack Viaduct was taken over by the Main Roads Board. The board sought to improve the route of the Great Western Highway between Emu Plains and Blaxland, that at the time zig zagged up Mitchell's Pass which replaced Old Bathurst Road in 1832. The viaduct's carriageway was widened to allow for two car lanes, by trimming back the inside face of the stone parapets. The new road was opened by Governor Sir Dudley DeChair on 23 October 1926. The viaduct was again widened in 1939, with the construction of a reinforced concrete cantilevered deck, because of increased traffic use.

The final deviation of the Great Western Highway, with the opening of the M4 Western Motorway in 1993, ended traffic flow across the Knapsack Viaduct. In 1995 the Viaduct was reopened to the public as part of the historic Lapstone Zig Zag walk.

Present day 
The line of the old track and cuttings (including the long abandoned platform of Lucasville station), and the old Knapsack Gully bridge is now a popular bushwalking track. Often a cacophony of birdsong and insects can be heard where the gully is deep at the viaduct and it would tend to echo these sounds, especially that of the bell miner. Although the original tunnel is closed there is also a bush walk that will take you close to its entrance.

Gallery

See also

 1892 Glenbrook Deviation
 1913 Glenbrook Deviation
 1892 Glenbrook Tunnel
 1913 Glenbrook Tunnel
 Lennox Bridge, Glenbrook
 List of tunnels in Australia
 Lithgow Zig Zag

Coordinates

  - Knapsack VIaduct
  - Bottom Points
  - Top Points 
  - Lucasville Platform 
  - Breakfast Point halt 
  - Glenbrook Tunnel east portal 
  - Glenbrook Tunnel west portal 
  - Glenbrook station

References

Attribution

Bibliography 
 
 
 
 
  thesis

External links 

 Lapstone Rail Trail

1865 establishments in Australia
Articles incorporating text from the New South Wales Heritage Database
Bridges completed in 1865
Former railway bridges in Australia
Glenbrook, New South Wales
History of the Blue Mountains (New South Wales)
Main Western railway line, New South Wales
New South Wales Heritage Database
Rail infrastructure in New South Wales
Rail trail bridges
Railway bridges in New South Wales
Railway lines in New South Wales
Railways with Zig Zags
Sandstone bridges in Australia
Stone arch bridges in Australia
Transport in the Blue Mountains (New South Wales)
Works of John Whitton